The J. Nelson Kelly House is a building in Grand Forks, North Dakota that was listed on the National Register of Historic Places in 1994. The property is also known as Lord Byron's Bed and Breakfast and denoted as 32 GF 1387. It was built or has other significance in 1897. When listed the property included the house as the one contributing building and also one non-contributing building, which is a relatively modern garage.

History
It was built from a catalog design and was the home of James Nelson Kelly (1858 - 1934) who  was the first superintendent of Grand Forks high school (1894-1919).
It was designed by George Franklin Barber (1854–1915) and was built by A. F. Turner.  It includes Colonial Revival and Queen Anne architecture.

References

Related reading
Clement A. Lounsberry (1917) North Dakota History and People, Volume III (S. J. Clarke Publishing Company, Chicago)

Houses on the National Register of Historic Places in North Dakota
Houses in Grand Forks, North Dakota
Colonial Revival architecture in North Dakota
Queen Anne architecture in North Dakota
Houses completed in 1897
National Register of Historic Places in Grand Forks, North Dakota
1897 establishments in North Dakota